The 2005 NCAA Division I Men's Golf Championships were contested at the 67th annual NCAA-sanctioned golf tournament for determining the individual and team national champions of men's collegiate golf at the Division I level in the United States.

The tournament was held at the Caves Valley Golf Club in Owings Mills, Maryland.

Georgia won the team championship, the Bulldogs' second NCAA title and the first since 1999.

James Lepp, from Washington, won the individual title.

Qualifying
The NCAA held three regional qualifying tournaments, with the top ten teams from each event qualifying for the national championship.

Individual results

Individual champion
 James Lepp, Washington (276)

Team results

Eliminated after 54 holes

DC = Defending champions
Debut appearance

References

NCAA Men's Golf Championship
Golf in Maryland
NCAA Golf Championship
NCAA Golf Championship
NCAA Golf Championship